The men's 100 yard backstroke was a swimming event held as part of the Swimming at the 1904 Summer Olympics programme. It was the first time the event was held at such a distance at the Olympics and the only time yards rather than metres were used.

6 swimmers from 2 nations competed.

Results

Final

References

Sources
 

Swimming at the 1904 Summer Olympics